Here's My Plan is a 2021 South Korean television series starring Kim Hwan-hee, Ryu Soo-young, Kim Do-hoon and Lee Young-jin. The screenplay won the award for outstanding work at the 2020 MBC Drama Screenplay Contest and was selected with the highest praise from judges. It aired on MBC TV from May 19–27, 2021.

Synopsis
The story of a young woman who believes that her whole life has been unfortunate and plans the "Happiness Ruining Project" to avenge those who made her life unhappy.

Cast

Main
 Kim Hwan-hee as Lee So-hyun
 A young woman who drops out of high school and lives by pick-pocketing to support herself.
 Ryu Soo-young as Lee Jae-young
 The owner of a small chicken restaurant called Happy Chicken who is friendly and kind-hearted.
 Kim Do-hoon as Jo Yoon-ho
 A part-time delivery worker at Happy Chicken.
 Lee Young-jin as Kim Yoo-mi
 So-hyun's mother who is dependent on alcohol and is indifferent to her daughter.

Supporting
  as Hee-jin
 So-hyun's friend.
 Lee Jin-hee as Kim Bok-hee
 The caregiver of Yoon-ho's grandmother.
  as Hye-soon
 Yoon-ho's grandmother who has dementia.
 Lee Si-woo as Jun-sik
 A high school student.

References

External links
  
 
 

MBC TV television dramas
Korean-language television shows
2021 South Korean television series debuts
2021 South Korean television series endings
South Korean romance television series